The Alcis or Alci (Proto-Germanic  ~ ) were a pair of divine young brothers worshipped by the Naharvali, an ancient Germanic tribe from Central Europe. The Alcis are solely attested by Roman historian and senator Tacitus in his ethnography Germania, written around 98 AD.

Name 
 
According to some scholars, the name Alcis should be interpreted as a latinized form of Proto-Germanic  ~  (variants  ~ ), meaning 'elk (Alces alces)'. It might thus be cognate with the Old Norse elgr, from the type , and with Old English eolh and Old High German elaho, from the types *elho-, *elhōn-. This would make the Alcis brothers the elk- or stag-gods. According to the Oxford English Dictionary, the Latin alces and Greek álkē (ἄλκη) were "probably adopted from Germanic or some other northern language".

Other scholars propose to link  to the Germanic root - (cf. Goth. alhs 'temple', Old English ealgian 'to protect'; further Lith. alkas 'holy grove'), and thus to interpret the Alcis as 'protective' deities.

Attestation
According to Tacitus, the Alcis were a divine pair worshiped by the Naharvali. He identifies the latter as a subgroup of the Lugii, whom he seems to locate in Silesia. The Roman historian states that their cult took place in a sacred grove, with a priest dressed in women's clothing presiding. The deities were given the name Alcis, and venerated as young men and brothers, but no images of them were used. A similarity with Castor and Pollux is noted by Tacitus, though he states the cult was indigenous, not derived from an outside influence.

The source of Tacitus' information about the Alcis remains unclear. Since the Naharvali lived far from the Rhineland, he must have learnt of the deities from a secondary source, either from other Germanic tribes that lived closer to the empire, or from someone who had travelled from the empire to the land of the Naharvali. According to scholar James B. Rives, the second hypothesis appears more likely: the amber trade route passed through what is now Silesia, and ancient merchants are known to have drawn up descriptions of their journey. Furthermore, the interpretatio romana of the Alcis as equivalent to Castor and Polux was probably done by someone from the Graeco-Roman world.

Scholarly reception
The Alcis are generally regarded in scholarship as a reflex of the Divine Twins, a pair of Indo-European youthful horsemen. Tacitus identifies the Alcis with the Graeco-Roman Castor and Pollux, another probable reflex of the Divine Twins (along with the Ashvins, Ašvieniai, and Dieva Dēli). Despite the lack of pictorial representation, the Roman historian (or his source) probably did this "translation" based on reported attributes of the Alcis, who are described are divine young men and brothers.

This origin may give support to the interpretation of the Alcis as elk-shaped or elk-gods, even though the widespread description of the Divine Twins as rescuers, healers and protectors in other Indo-European mythologies does not rule out the second proposition either. A speculative relation of the cult with the Germanic rune Algiz which is interpreted in the later Old Norse Sigrdrífumál as laeknishendr ('healing hands'), may be significant in our understanding of the etymological issue.

See also
Grevensvænge figurines
Hengist and Horsa
Haddingjar
Divine twins
Aśvins brothers of Hindu mythology

Footnotes

References

Bibliography

Primary sources
.

Further reading
 

Germanic gods

Divine twins